Eugene Sampson Pitt (November 6, 1937 – June 29, 2018) was a black American musician and the founding member of The Jive Five. He formed a group with some school friends in 1954 called the Genies, in which he was the lead singer. There were no recordings from this group.

In 1959, he, together with Jerome Hanna, Richard Harris, Norman Johnson, and Billy Prophet formed The Jive Five. Among their classic doo-wop recordings, released on Bel-tone Records, were "My True Story", "Never, Never", and "What Time Is It?".

In 1985, they sang doo wop on the children's cable television network Nickelodeon. Pitt and The Jive Five were introduced to New York-based MTV Networks (now Paramount Media Networks) branding consultants Fred Seibert and Alan Goodman by his latest producer, Ambient Sound's Marty Pekar.  Together, they embarked on an almost 10-year relationship, creating and singing the a cappella signature sound of the children's television network. Terry Stewart, President & CEO of the Rock and Roll Hall of Fame, called Pitt "the most underrated soul singer in America".

Eugene's cousin, Elijah Pitts, was an NFL running back and long-time assistant coach.

On June 29, 2018, Pitt died at the age of 80 due to complications from diabetes.

References

External links
 
 
 

1937 births
2018 deaths
Musicians from Brooklyn